The 1961 Tour de Suisse was the 25th edition of the Tour de Suisse cycle race and was held from 15 June to 21 June 1961. The race started in Zürich and finished in Lucerne. The race was won by Attilio Moresi of the Carpano team.

General classification

References

1961
Tour de Suisse